Jesús David Murillo León (born 17 August 1993) is a Colombian footballer who plays as a right back for Atlético Junior in the Categoría Primera A.

Honours

Club
Junior
 Copa Colombia (2): 2015, 2017

References

Living people
1993 births
Footballers from Cali
Colombian footballers
Association football fullbacks
Atlético Junior footballers
Barranquilla F.C. footballers
Patriotas Boyacá footballers